Papilio hipponous is a butterfly of the family Papilionidae. It is found in the Philippines.

The larvae feed on Citrus species.

Subspecies
Papilio hipponous bazilanus Fruhstorfer, 1899 (Philippines (Basilan, Mindanao))
Papilio hipponous daku (Page & Treadaway, 2003)  (Philippines (Marinduque, Mindoro))
Papilio hipponous gamay (Page & Treadaway, 2003)  (Philippines (Balabac, Palawan))
Papilio hipponous hipponous (Philippines (Camiguin de Luzon, Luzon))
Papilio hipponous leptosephus Fruhstorfer, 1909 (Assam)
Papilio hipponous lunifer Rothschild, 1894 (Talaud, Sangie Islands)
Papilio hipponous lynn (Page & Treadaway, 2003)  (Philippines (Cuyo Islands))
Papilio hipponous madil (Page & Treadaway, 2003)  (Philippines (Busuanga))
Papilio hipponous palpag (Page & Treadaway, 2003)  (Philippines (Sanga Sanga, Sibuti, Tawitawi))
Papilio hipponous rolandi (Page & Treadaway, 2003)  (Philippines (Panay, Bohol, Siquijor, Negros))

Taxonomy

Papilio hipponous is a member of the fuscus species group. The members of this clade are

 Papilio albinus Wallace, 1865
 Papilio diophantus Grose-Smith, 1883
 Papilio fuscus Goeze, 1779
 Papilio hipponous C. & R. Felder, 1862
 Papilio jordani Fruhstorfer, 1906
 Papilio pitmani Elwes & de Nicéville, [1887]
 Papilio prexaspes C. & R. Felder, 1865
 Papilio sakontala Hewitson, 1864

References

Page M. G.P & Treadaway,C. G.  2003 Schmetterlinge der Erde, Butterflies of the world Part XVII (17), Papilionidae IX Papilionidae of the Philippine Islands. Edited by Erich Bauer and Thomas Frankenbach Keltern: Goecke & Evers; Canterbury: Hillside Books.

External links

= The Global Butterfly Information System Images of specimens deposited in the Natural History Museum, London including syntypes of bazilanus Fruhstorfer. Taxonomic history.

hipponous
Butterflies of Asia
Endemic fauna of the Philippines
Lepidoptera of the Philippines
Butterflies of Indochina